Urvashi Kalyana is a 1993 Kannada film directed by Phani Ramachandra. This was the first time Phani Ramachandra directed Jaggesh. The plot centers on how kids of scheming neighbors turned foes unite, due to their children falling in love with each other.

Cast
 Jaggesh
 Priyanka Srivastava
 Doddanna
 Girija Lokesh
 Satyabhama
 Bank Janardhan
 Srilalitha as Akkayyamma
 Abhinaya as Jaggesh's younger sister

References

1993 films
Indian comedy films
Films directed by Phani Ramachandra
1993 comedy films